Pradosia cuatrecasasii is a species of plant in the family Sapotaceae. It is endemic to Colombia.

References

cuatrecasasii
Endemic flora of Colombia
Vulnerable plants
Taxonomy articles created by Polbot
Taxa named by André Aubréville